Back to Scratch is the sixth studio album from Welsh singer-songwriter Charlotte Church. The album was released on 25 October 2010, five years after the release of Church's fifth studio album Tissues and Issues. The album has been described by Church as having a "new different sound but also one that goes with my voice", Church has also described the album as more mature and as having a more "quirky" vibe than her last and final album. The album was preceded by the lead single and title track "Back to Scratch" on 19 September 2010, which was originally written about a relative but which Church has recently described as being more relevant to her own split from former boyfriend Gavin Henson. The 2010 album was her first release on her own label Dooby Records after signing a $3m investment deal with all her previous albums being released on longtime label Sony Music. The song "Ruby" is a cover of Camille's song of the same name, written by Euston Jones and taken from her debut album Le Sac des Filles. A US release was planned for 2011, but was cancelled when Church severed her relationship with her label.

Track listing

Charts 
The album entered the official UK Top 75 album chart at Number 23 on 31 October 2010. The following week it dropped 42 places to Number 65.

Release history

References

Charlotte Church albums
2010 albums